First Presbyterian Church is a historic church at 601 Church Street in Sweetwater, Tennessee, affiliated with Presbyterian Church (USA).

The congregation was formed in 1860. The church building was completed in 1887. It was added to the National Register of Historic Places in 2001.

References

External links
 

Presbyterian churches in Tennessee
Churches on the National Register of Historic Places in Tennessee
Gothic Revival church buildings in Tennessee
Churches completed in 1887
19th-century Presbyterian church buildings in the United States
Buildings and structures in Monroe County, Tennessee
National Register of Historic Places in Monroe County, Tennessee